On the afternoon of May 20, 2013, a large and extremely violent EF5 tornado ravaged through Moore, Oklahoma, and adjacent areas, with peak winds estimated at , killing 24 people (plus two indirect fatalities) and injuring 212 others. The tornado was part of a larger weather system that had produced several other tornadoes across the Great Plains over the previous two days, including five that struck portions of Central Oklahoma the day prior on May 19.

The tornado touched down just northwest of Newcastle at 2:56 p.m. CDT (19:46 UTC), and stayed on the ground for 39 minutes over a  path, crossing through a heavily populated section of Moore. It followed a roughly similar track to the deadlier 1999 Bridge Creek–Moore tornado, which was smaller in size but just as severe; however, very few homes and neither of the stricken schools in the area had purpose-built storm shelters in the intervening years since the earlier tornado struck Moore.

Meteorological synopsis

On May 20, 2013, a prominent central upper trough moved eastward toward the Central United States, with a lead upper low pivoting over the Dakotas and Upper Midwest region. A Southern stream shortwave trough and a moderately strong polar jet moved east-northeastward over the southern Rockies to the southern Great Plains and Ozarks area, with severe thunderstorms forming during the peak hours of heating. With the influence of moderately strong cyclonic flow aloft, the air mass was expected to become unstable across much of the southern Great Plains, Ozarks, and middle Mississippi Valley by the afternoon hours.

Evidence of an unstable air mass included temperatures in the low to mid 80s °F (27–30 °C), dewpoints that ranged in the upper 60s °F (20 °C) to the lower 70s °F (20–22 °C), and CAPE values ranging from 3500 to 5000 J/kg. Deep-layer wind shear speeds of  enhanced storm structure and intensity. These were present ahead of a cold front extending from a surface low in the eastern Dakotas, southwestward to near the Kansas City area and western Oklahoma, and ahead of a dry line extending from southwest Oklahoma southward into northwestern and west-central Texas. Outflow remnants from the previous night and the early day convection across the Ozarks and the middle Mississippi Valley were a factor in severe weather development with the most aggressive heating and destabilization on the western edge of this activity across the southern Great Plains and just ahead of a cold front. The National Weather Service office in Norman, Oklahoma had warned as early as May 15 that there would be a possibility of severe weather on May 20.

The most intense severe weather activity was expected to come across the southern Great Plains, specifically Central Oklahoma, during the afternoon hours on that Monday. As such, the Storm Prediction Center issued a moderate risk of severe thunderstorms during the early morning hours of May 20 from southeastern Missouri to north-central Texas. The degree of wind shear, moisture, and instability within the warm sector favored the development of supercells. Very large hail and tornadoes were both expected with these supercells, with the possibility of a few strong tornadoes. The Storm Prediction Center issued a tornado watch at 1:10 p.m. Central Daylight Time (CDT) early that afternoon for the eastern two-thirds of Oklahoma, northwestern Arkansas, and portions of north-central Texas. Given the atmospheric parameters thought to be in place at the time, the Storm Prediction Center inadvertently underestimated the threat of tornadic activity that afternoon; the probability table for the tornado watch – the 191st severe weather watch issued by the guidance center in 2013 – indicated a 40% (or "moderate") probability of two or more tornadoes and a 20% (or "low") probability of one or more tornadoes reaching between EF2 and EF5 intensity within the watch area. The watch did, however, say that "one or two strong tornadoes" were possible.

Storm development and track
 

The thunderstorm that eventually produced the tornado developed less than one hour after the tornado watch was issued, around 2:00 p.m. CDT, across northern Grady County. Its rapid intensification resulted in the National Weather Service Weather Forecast Office in Norman issuing a severe thunderstorm warning for northern Grady, northwestern Cleveland, northern McClain, and southwestern Oklahoma Counties (including southwestern portions of the immediate Oklahoma City area) at 2:12 p.m. CDT. The thunderstorm quickly attained supercell characteristics, with rotation at the mid-levels of the storm's cloud structure becoming apparent even before it was officially classified as severe, due to the sufficient amounts of wind shear present over central Oklahoma.

Due to the expected intensity of the storms, which were expected to be equal – if not, stronger – in severity to the supercells that produced the five tornadoes in the expected area of greatest tornadic threat the day prior, three of the Oklahoma City market's five television news outlets − NBC affiliate KFOR-TV (channel 4), ABC affiliate KOCO-TV (channel 5) and CBS affiliate KWTV (channel 9) − suspended normal programming and went into wall-to-wall weather coverage immediately after the tornado watch went into effect (Fox affiliate KOKH-TV (channel 25) and Telemundo affiliate KTUZ-TV (channel 30) began their coverage as the first severe thunderstorms erupted southwest of the state capital), and subsequently began relaying their audio feeds to radio stations throughout central Oklahoma. As the forecast suggested that the most significant severe weather would occur in the mid-afternoon, around the time classes concluded for the day, many worried parents began arriving at schools throughout Moore and south Oklahoma City to pick up their children in advance of the storm. At 2:40 p.m. CDT, as rotation in the supercell was increasing at the cloud base, a tornado warning was issued for far northeastern Grady, western Cleveland, northern McClain, and southern Oklahoma Counties, as the storm approached the Oklahoma City metropolitan area.

Tornado forms 
The tornado touched down at 2:56 p.m. Initially a narrow cone-shaped tornado, it first caused EF1 damage to a home and some trees before rapidly intensifying and striking a semi-rural subdivision on the north side of Northwest 32nd, where several homes were destroyed, two of which were leveled at EF4 intensity. At this point, the tornado began to grow rapidly in size, evolving into a large, wedge-shaped structure. Slight ground scouring began in this area, and several homes in a subdivision further to the northeast sustained EF3 damage. By 3:01 p.m. CDT, the National Weather Service issued a second, more strongly worded warning for the area: in a severe weather statement updating the existing tornado warning, the Norman forecast office declared a tornado emergency for southern Oklahoma City and Moore as various storm spotters confirmed that the large, violent tornado was approaching the area. The Twin Lakes dual-polarization NEXRAD radar (near Lake Stanley Draper) detected a tornado debris signature one mile in diameter within the accompanying hook echo, as the tornado crossed into portions of south Oklahoma City in northern Cleveland County.

The tornado maintained EF3 intensity as it crossed the Canadian River into Cleveland County, and a decommissioned U.S. 62/U.S. 277 bridge was severely damaged; this bridge had to be demolished after the tornado ripped part of it from its mount and tossed it across Interstate 44. The tornado then continued directly toward south Oklahoma City and Moore, roughly following Southwest 149th Street. At that point, it began to grow rapidly in width, and a second brief area of EF4 damage was noted near South May Avenue, where several homes were leveled, and one was swept clean from its foundation (this home was determined to have been nailed, rather than bolted to its foundation). A vehicle frame, engine block, and various other vehicle parts were found tangled within a grove of completely debarked trees in this area. As the tornado began to cross into south Oklahoma City, a traffic jam had occurred for a stretch of several miles along Santa Fe Avenue, as residents attempted to either escape from or pick up their children at schools located near the tornado's path. As the station's news helicopter was capturing live video of the tornado, then-KWTV chief meteorologist Gary England − upon seeing footage of the backup that was being relayed by pilot Jim Gardner − urged drivers caught in the jam that may have been listening to the station's audio simulcast on area radio outlets to use nearby streets to detour out of the tornado's expected track. The tornado weakened briefly to an EF3 before re-intensifying to EF4 intensity near Forman Drive, flattening several homes as it moved through mostly rural areas south of Southwest 149th Street. As the tornado struck an oil production site, four oil tanks were blown away, one of which was never found. The others were thrown considerable distances; one was found a mile away.

Tornado enters Moore 
The tornado maintained its intensity as it struck the Orr Family Farm and the Celestial Acres horse training area, where up to 100 horses were reported killed, some being tossed into and tangled in downed power lines or thrown on top of nearby buildings; several horses that survived the tornado suffered severe injuries, with some being impaled by tree limbs or boards. Every building at Celestial Acres was either leveled or swept away at EF4 intensity, the ground on the property was scoured to bare soil, debris from structures was granulated, and vehicles were thrown and stripped down to their frames. Surveyors noted that based on the contextual damage, the tornado was likely at EF5 intensity in this area, though the construction quality of the affected buildings only permitted an EF4 rating. A 10-ton propane tank on the Orr Farm property was picked up and thrown more than a half-mile through the air by the tornado, and a strip mall near the farm was completely leveled as well. The tornado continued east, heavily scouring an open grassy field before slamming into Briarwood Elementary School, which was completely destroyed. The NWS originally rated this damage EF5, but further evaluation and a 2014 study published by the American Meteorological Society revealed evidence of poor construction at the school, and the rating was downgraded to EF4. Remarkably, no fatalities occurred at the school. Two 12,000-gallon water tanks that were also swept off of the Orr Family Farm grounds were thrown into this area; the roof of Briarwood Elementary was struck by one of them − potentially aiding in compromising the building's structural integrity as it bent the steel girders that held up the roof − shortly before the main vortex struck the building, while the other fell onto and destroyed a home a few blocks east of the school. Past Briarwood Elementary, the tornado intensified even further and entered densely populated areas of western Moore, including the Westmoor subdivision where many well-built, anchor-bolted brick homes were flattened at EF4 intensity, and two were swept clean from their foundations, with damage at those two homes rated EF5.

The tornado continued generally northeast at EF4 strength, completely debarking trees and leveling entire neighborhoods. Many homes were flattened in neighborhoods to the east of South Santa Fe Avenue. One anchor-bolted home that was reduced to a bare slab in this area was initially rated EF5, but was later downgraded to EF4 as closer inspection of the foundation revealed that the anchor bolts were missing their nuts and washers. The tornado then destroyed Plaza Towers Elementary School at EF4 intensity, where seven children were killed when a cinder block wall collapsed on top of them. More than a dozen homes in a subdivision just to the south of Plaza Towers Elementary were swept cleanly away, though they were revealed to have been nailed rather than bolted to their foundations, and damage to this subdivision was subsequently rated EF4, though the tornado was likely extremely violent as lawns in this area were completely scoured down to bare soil. Entire blocks of homes were flattened, trees were completely debarked and denuded, vehicles were thrown and mangled, and the ground was severely scoured in other residential areas nearby, with the damage also rated EF4 in these areas. Most of the fatalities from the tornado occurred in the Plaza Towers neighborhood of Moore. In one of these houses (a block away from Plaza Towers Elementary), a woman was killed as she tried to seek shelter in a closet.

Further to the northeast, at least a dozen cars were piled up against the front entrance of the Moore Medical Center, which sustained EF4 damage. One car was lofted and thrown onto the roof. Many homes in neighborhoods near the medical center were completely destroyed, including a row of four well-built brick homes with anchor bolts that were swept away, with damage to those four homes rated EF5. An open field directly behind this row of homes was deeply scoured, with only bare soil and clumps of dirt remaining. A nearby manhole cover was removed, and multiple vehicles were mangled beyond recognition and caked in mud in this area as well. The nearby Warren Theater was spared a direct hit, but still sustained considerable damage to its exterior. A bowling alley in the area was leveled, and a 7-Eleven which was on the northern part of the damage path, was completely flattened  with four people killed inside (including a three-month-old infant). The nearby Moore Cemetery was heavily damaged as well.

The tornado briefly weakened and caused EF3 damage to some other businesses near Interstate 35, before crossing and mangling several vehicles in the process. The tornado regained EF4 intensity on the other side of the Interstate as it tore through several neighborhoods and destroyed numerous additional homes (though the EF4 damage swath was narrower at this point). A large grassy field between two subdivisions in this area was scoured to bare soil, with wind-rowed structural debris and several mangled vehicles strewn to the east. One brick home on Hunters Glen Court sustained EF5 damage, with only the slab foundation and anchor bolts remaining. Very little structural debris or house contents was recovered from that residence, and the small amount of debris that remained was wind-rowed well away from the site.

The tornado continued through Moore's eastern neighborhoods. Highland East Jr. High's main building was spared, but the separate gymnasium building was completely destroyed, and a set of lockers from the structure was lofted and thrown a considerable distance into a nearby neighborhood. The Moore Public Schools administration building, a converted former hospital located a few blocks to the east, was also struck and destroyed. The tornado was noticeably narrower at this point, but was still causing a continuous swath of EF4 damage to numerous homes as it moved through multiple subdivisions. A well-built, anchor-bolted home at the corner of Heatherwood Drive and Southeast 5th Street was reduced to a bare slab, sustaining EF5 damage. A large, well-bolted-down home at the end of a private drive near South Olde Bridge Road was also swept cleanly away at EF5 intensity. Debris was scattered well away from the site, a vehicle was thrown over 100 yards, and wind-rowing was again noted at that location.

Tornado weakens and dissipates 
Further east, the tornado weakened to EF3 strength and exited the most populated parts of Moore, destroying six industrial buildings and damaging two others. A final small area of EF4 damage was noted nearby as two homes and a concrete building were leveled. The tornado then began to rapidly narrow and weaken, snapping and uprooting several trees and causing EF2 damage to a farm just east of Moore, where the house lost its roof and an outbuilding was destroyed. The violent updrafts in the supercell that produced the tornado lofted debris from homes and other buildings in Moore at least  outside of the tornado's outer circulation, with reports of various objects and personal possessions being found as far away as Midwest City. At 3:35 p.m. CDT, the tornado dissipated at a nearby tree line about one-third of a mile east of Air Depot Boulevard.

Impact

The Oklahoma Department of Emergency Management reported that 25 people were killed (with another death indirectly attributed to the tornado). An estimated 1,150 homes were destroyed, resulting in an estimated $2 billion in damages. The number of injured was 377. Entire subdivisions were obliterated, and houses were flattened in a large swath of the city. The majority of a neighborhood just west of the Moore Medical Center was destroyed. Witnesses said the tornado more closely resembled "a giant black wall of destruction" than a typical twister.

Among the hardest hit areas were two public schools: Briarwood Elementary School and Plaza Towers Elementary School. A preliminary study of Briarwood Elementary School conducted in September 2013 by a group of structural engineers found some structural deficiencies that led to its collapse during the tornado. Chris Ramseyer, a structural engineer and an associate professor at the University of Oklahoma determined that the building's walls that were not reinforced with concrete, there had been a lack of connection between the masonry walls and support beams in several portions of the building, and anchor bolts were pulled from the ground by the tornado. Another engineer that was involved in the study stated that the deficiencies that Ramseyer pointed out were not uncommon building practices at the time, and that current building code standards would not ensure that Briarwood would have withstood winds in excess of 200 mph.

At Plaza Towers, the second school to be hit, parents had been allowed to collect their children early in preparation for the oncoming storm. Therefore, by the time the tornado struck only about 75 students and teachers were in the building. Many students and teachers took shelter in bathrooms and closets, but in a newer addition to the building which housed the school's second and third grade classrooms, seven fatalities occurred. Third grade teacher Jennifer Doan was taking shelter with eleven of her students in a hallway when the tornado struck. Doan and her students were trapped when the walls of the corridor collapsed on top of them. Doan, who was two months pregnant with her third child at the time, suffered severe injuries to her back, but did not lose the baby. She and five of her students were pulled out, with the children suffering only minor to moderate injuries. Another six of her students along with a student from another third grade class died.

The Moore Medical Center was heavily damaged, but no one present in the building was injured by the tornado. The center's staff had to relocate 30 patients to a hospital in Norman and another hospital. Part of Interstate 35 was shut down due to debris that had been thrown onto the freeway. On May 21, Moore still did not have running water. There were more than 61,500 power outages related to the tornado. More than 100 people were rescued from areas that sustained significant damage from the tornado.

The Oklahoma Department of Insurance estimated that insurance claims for damage would likely be more than $1 billion. Some meteorologists estimated that the energy released by the storm could have been eight to more than 600 times greater than the atomic bomb dropped on Hiroshima.

Casualties

In addition to erroneous reports concerning the status of Briarwood and Plaza Towers students, various reports regarding fatality and injury counts as well as persons unaccounted for were circulated by traditional and social media outlets in the immediate hours after the tornado struck, which could not immediately be confirmed or refuted due to communications disruptions in the affected areas or were the result of incorrect counting due to miscommunication of estimates. Within the first two days, it was reported that between 237 and 240 people had been injured, with the tally later increasing to over 350. The final count of injuries was later adjusted downward to 212.

On the morning of May 21, the medical examiner's office incorrectly stated that 91 bodies of tornado victims had been received. This number was up from the earlier report of 51 bodies that were incorrectly stated as having been received. Upon the office's discovery that some victims were mistakenly counted twice due to communication errors made by Moore rescue response units that the bodies were admitted to area funeral homes (nearly all of the deceased were actually transported to the examiner's office in Oklahoma City), the actual number was revised downward and later confirmed at 24 tornado victims and two indirect victims. The first two deaths occurred in a house east of Briarwood Elementary School; one occurred near Santa Fe Avenue; seven occurred following a wall collapse at Plaza Towers Elementary; nine occurred within the neighborhoods mainly south of Plaza Towers Elementary; one occurred just east of Interstate 35; and one occurred in a home between Eastern Avenue and Bryant Avenue. A 90-year-old woman who suffered a fractured skull during the tornado later suffered a pair of strokes and died on August 5. On May 6, 2018, nearly five years after the tornado, a 14-year-old survivor who suffered posttraumatic stress disorder after losing seven of his friends at Plaza Towers Elementary School committed suicide. The 2013 Moore tornado was the deadliest tornado recorded in the U.S. since the Joplin, Missouri tornado that killed 158 people in May 2011.

Patients were taken to Integris Southwest Medical Center and The Children's Hospital at OU Medical Center in Oklahoma City. Over 140 patients, including at least 70 children, were treated at hospitals.

Aftermath

Oklahoma Governor Mary Fallin declared a state of emergency on May 20. She held her first post-tornado news conference at noon on May 21. The Federal Emergency Management Agency deployed urban search and rescue teams to the tornado-hit areas, and provided incident command personnel to organize and support rescue efforts. The Oklahoma National Guard was also deployed. Governor Mary Fallin requested assistance from then-President Barack Obama who declared a major disaster in the state and ordered federal aid to the affected areas. Governor Fallin quickly dismissed an idea to make a law that would require all schools in Oklahoma to have a shelter that would protect children during severe weather (prior to the tornado, only two of the twelve schools in the Moore Public Schools district had storm shelters, Kelley Elementary and Westmoore High School, which were rebuilt with concrete safe rooms after both were destroyed in the 1999 Bridge Creek–Moore tornado).

Cleveland, Lincoln, McClain, Oklahoma, and Pottawatomie Counties received federal funding for hazard mitigation measure statewide. Obama visited the disaster-stricken areas on May 26.

The third season finale of the sitcom Mike & Molly, titled "Windy City", was pulled by CBS from its original May 20 airdate within hours of the event due to the episode featuring a plotline involving a tornado descending on Chicago; the network later rescheduled the episode to air ten days later on May 30, 2013.

At noon on May 21, the U.S. Senate held a moment of silence for the victims. Delegates from several countries and Pope Francis offered condolences, and the United Nations offered assistance in the recovery efforts. The Canadian Red Cross began accepting donations of money and supplies for their American counterparts, to assist with disaster relief and recovery.

The United Methodist Committee on Relief, Direct Relief, Matt Kemp of the Los Angeles Dodgers, Kevin Durant of the Oklahoma City Thunder, Continental Resources, Devon Energy, ONEOK, Koch Industries, Hobby Lobby, and Carrie Underwood all pledged donations to the relief efforts.

Moore Mayor Glenn Lewis stated that he would attempt to get an ordinance passed requiring storm shelters or safe rooms in new housing projects.

On May 29, 2013, NBC aired Healing in the Heartland: Relief Benefit Concert, a fundraising concert that was held at Chesapeake Energy Arena in downtown Oklahoma City. The benefit was hosted by country singer and Oklahoma native Blake Shelton and featured performances from Miranda Lambert, Vince Gill, Reba McEntire, Rascal Flatts, Usher, Darius Rucker and Luke Bryan. The concert raised more than $6 million for the United Way of Central Oklahoma.

On June 2, 2013, Discovery Channel aired an hour-long documentary about the storm titled Mile-Wide Tornado: Oklahoma Disaster. The documentary provides a comprehensive look at the tornado's impact and drew comparisons of the storm to the 1999 Bridge Creek-Moore tornado.

The Moore City Council proposed a measure making twelve changes to its residential building codes, include requiring that new home construction in the city include hurricane clips or framing anchors, continuous plywood bracing and wind-resistant garage doors in order for homes to withstand winds up to 135 mph (equivalent to a high-end EF2 tornado). When the measure was passed in a unanimous vote held on March 17, 2014, Moore became the first city in the United States to adopt a building code addressing the effects of tornadoes on homes, which exceed the national standards set by the National Association of Home Builders.

See also

 Tornadoes of 2013
 Tornado outbreak of May 18–21, 2013
 List of North American tornadoes and tornado outbreaks
 List of F5 and EF5 tornadoes
 List of tornado-related deaths at schools
 1999 Bridge Creek–Moore tornado – an even deadlier (rated F5) that struck nearby areas 14 years earlier
 2003 Moore tornado – a slightly weaker F4 tornado that struck similar areas almost ten years earlier
 2010 Moore – Choctaw tornado – a slightly weaker EF4 tornado that struck nearby areas three years earlier
 2013 El Reno tornado – The largest tornado on record that struck nearby areas 11 days later (rated at EF3)
 List of Cleveland County, Oklahoma tornadoes

References

External links

Preliminary Reconnaissance of the May 20, 2013, Newcastle-Moore Tornado in Oklahoma (National Institute of Standards and Technology)
Moore, Oklahoma Tornadoes (1890–Present) from the National Oceanic and Atmospheric Administration

Videos
 
 
 
 
 Family that lived through the tornado

Maps
 Satellite images of Moore taken on May 22, 2013 – two days after the tornado from Google Crisis Response
 Map of tornado path and damage from The New York Times
 Map of tornadoes in OKC metro area since 1950 from the Los Angeles Times
 2011 Moore City Map from City of Moore
 2013 Oklahoma City Metro Map from Oklahoma Department Of Transportation

Moore tornado
Moore tornado
F5 tornadoes
Tornadoes in Oklahoma
Moore tornado
May 2013 events in the United States